The Bogoliubov Prize is an award offered by the National Academy of Sciences of Ukraine for scientists with outstanding contribution to theoretical physics and applied mathematics. The award is issued in the memory of theoretical physicist and mathematician Nikolay Bogoliubov.

The award was founded in 1992.

Laureates
2004 — Anton Grigorievich Naumovets
2002 — Leonid A. Pastur, for a cycle of works on research of the theory of a field and the theory of the disorder systems
2002 — Sergiy Peletminsky,  for the set of works "Field theory and the theory of disordered systems".  
1998 — A. V. Pogorelov, for a series of "Creation and support of advanced mathematical methods for solving problems in physics and mathematics"
1997 — Vasiliy S. Vladimirov
1996 — Vladimir A. Marchenko, for a series of "functional-algebraic methods in mathematical physics"
1993 — Yurii Mitropolskiy, for a series of his works "Method of averaging and its applications to mathematical and theoretical physics".

See also

 List of physics awards

References

Physics awards
Mathematics awards